Robert 'Bob' E. Goodin (born 30 November 1950) was Professor of Government at the University of Essex and is now Distinguished Professor of Philosophy and Social and Political theory at the Australian National University.

Biography 
Goodin attended Oxford University, where he earned a DPhil in politics in 1975.

He is a Fellow of the Academy of the Social Sciences in Australia and a Corresponding Fellow of the British Academy. In 2009 he won the Stein Rokkan Prize for Comparative Social Science Research, awarded by the International Social Science Council.

He is the founding editor of The Journal of Political Philosophy and a co-editor of the British Journal of Political Science.

In 2022, Goodin was awarded the prestigious Johan Skytte Prize in Political Science for his "acuity and success endeavored to blend political philosophy with empirical political science to increase the understanding of how decent and dignified societies can be shaped.”

Selected bibliography

Books

Journal articles

References

External links 
 Profile page: Bob Goodin, School of Philosophy, Research School of Social Sciences, Australian National University

1950 births
Academics of the University of Essex
Alumni of the University of Oxford
American philosophers
Academic staff of the Australian National University
Corresponding Fellows of the British Academy
Winners of the Stein Rokkan Prize for Comparative Social Science Research
Living people
Distinguished professors of philosophy